Wen'anyi is a town in Yanchuan County, Yan'an, Shaanxi, China.

History 
In 1958, Wen'anyi was established as a people's commune. Xi stayed in the village for seven years, performing manual labor and ascending the local political ranks. In May 1984, Wen'anyi was changed to a township, and in August, it was upgraded to a town.

Administrative divisions 
Wen'anyi administers 2 residential communities and 23 administrative villages.

Residential Communities 
Wen'anyi contains the following 2 residential communities:

 Wenzhou Community
 Wen'an Community

Villages 
Wen'anyi contains the following 23 administrative villages:

 Shangyi Village
 Xiayi Village
 Majiagou Village
 Yiluohe Village
 
 Baijiayuan Village
 Yujun Village
 Laozhuanghe Village
 Tuojiacha Village
 Lüjiahe Village
 Qiaojiahe Village
 Kangjia Village
 Fengjiawan Village
 Gaojiaping Village
 Zhangjiatun Village
 Majiaping Village
 Gaojiagetu Village
 Fanjiagou Village
 Haojiahe Village
 Donggeta Village
 Hejiahe Village
 Dumuyuan Village
 Poshihe Village

Demographics 
Wen'anyi has a hukou population of 22,098 as of 2018.

Prior to the merger of  into Wen'anyi, Wen'anyi's population per the 2010 Chinese Census was 4,178, down from the 5,474 recorded in the 2000 Chinese Census.

A 1996 population estimate put Wen'anyi's population at 7,000.

Economy 
 has become a major red tourism site, due to Xi Jinping's years living in the village. According to the People's Daily, about 2,500 people come to visit the village each year. A publication by the government of Yanchuan County reported that Wen'anyi spent 73 million renminbi in 2017 on infrastructure and beautification to further develop tourism.

Transport 
National Highway 210 runs through Wen'anyi.

References 

Township-level divisions of Shaanxi
Yan'an